Egypt–Sudan Railway Committee (ESRC) is a multinational committee that was created in 2008 to promote railway connecting lines between Egypt and Sudan.

Plan 
The proposed railway line to link the two countries is between Aswan and Wadi Halfa. The line will be around 500 km in length. 

The plan with distance is as follows:
  Aswan (0 km)
   border (450 km)
  Wadi Halfa (500 km)
  Khartoum capital {900 km)

Timeline

2021 
 Agreement

Challenges 
The main problem is the difference in terms of gauge between the two countries which lead to a Break of gauge. 

It is expected that the line between Khartoum and Wadi Halfa would be upgraded to standard gauge. 

Standard gauge would also enhance the extension of the line to serve other countries in the Nile valley.

Other challenges include adoption of
 Couplings - English (Egypt) - American AAR (Sudan)
 Brakes - Vacuum or Air
 Electrification - 25kVAC

Ferry 

A weekly ferry service on the Nile River connects the Egyptian railhead at Aswan with the Sudan railhead at Wadi Halfa. This ferry is made redundant by the new rail link.

See also 
 Railway stations in Sudan
 Railway stations in Egypt

References 

Egypt–Sudan relations
Rail transport in Africa
Rail transport in Egypt
Rail transport in Sudan